Salihu Modibbo Alfa Belgore   (born 17 January 1937) is a Nigerian Jurist and Chief Justice of Nigeria from 2006 to 2007.

Biography
Alfa Belgore was born on January 17, 1937, to a Fulani family in Ilorin, the capital of Kwara State north-central Nigeria.
He attended Okesuna Primary School as well as Middle School at Ilorin before he proceeded to Ilesa Grammar School where he obtained the West Africa School Certificate in 1956.
He received a bachelor's degree in Law in 1963 and also trained at Inner Temple for one year before he returned to Nigeria in 1964 and served magistrate in Northern Nigeria.
In 1986, he was appointed to the bench of the Supreme Court of Nigeria as Justice. 
He held several positions in the judiciary before he was appointed as Chief Justice of Nigeria in July 2006, a position he held until January 2007 when he retired.

Membership
Member, Nigerian Bar Association
Member, International Bar Association
Member, Nigerian Body of Benchers
Overseas Master of the Bench, Honourable Society of the Inner Temple

References

1937 births
Nigerian jurists
People from Kwara State
Living people
Nigerian Law School alumni
Supreme Court of Nigeria justices
Chief justices of Nigeria